Cosmophasis bitaeniata is a species of jumping spider found in Indonesia, Papua New Guinea, Australia, Micronesia, and Fiji. The common name is green ant hunter as it preys on the larvae of green tree ants (Oecophylla smaragdina).

Description
Cosmophasis bitaeniata have a reflective metallic-like sheen of yellow-gold on most of their body and legs, the colour of which varies with the ambient light. Narrow stripes of silver outlined with black are on the carapace and abdomen.

Gallery

References

Salticidae
Spiders of Oceania
Spiders described in 1882